The NA49 experiment ("North Area experiment 49") was a particle physics experiment that investigated the properties of quark–gluon plasma. It took place in the North Area of the Super Proton Synchrotron at CERN from 1991-2002. It used a large-acceptance hadron detector (a time projection chamber) to investigate reactions induced by the collision of various heavy ions (such as those of lead) on targets made of a variety of elements.

The NA49 experiment was the follow-up to the NA35 experiment, and was approved on 18 September 1991. The experiment began taking data in November 1994 and was completed on 19 October 2002. It was succeeded by the NA61 experiment (SHINE). The spokespersons for the experiment are Peter Seyboth (born 1939) and Reinhard Stock.

See also
 NA35 experiment
 NA61 experiment
 List of SPS experiments

References

External links

 NA49 experiment website
 NA49 experiment 'general public' website
 NA49 experiment @ CERN Document Server (Includes both committee documents and publications of the NA49 collaboration)
 CERN-NA-49 experiment record on INSPIRE-HEP

CERN experiments
Particle experiments